Michael Puleo is an American dancer, currently ballet master at the Compagnia Virgilio Sieni Danza, Florence, and assistant choreographer at Compagnia del Teatro Nuovo, Turin, Italy. He received his dance training at the Richard Andros Theater Art Center, the New York Performing Arts High School, and the School of American Ballet, and danced with the New York City Ballet, where he performed in the premieres of George Balanchine's Le Bourgeois Gentilhomme and Jerome Robbins' Eight Lines, as well as with the Armitage Ballet Love's End in Armitage 'Contempt' and at the Metropolitan Opera.

References
 NY Times review by Anna Kisselgoff, November 20, 1982
 NY Times review by Anna Kisselgoff, February 16, 1985
 NY Times review by Jennifer Dunning, May 21, 1989

American male ballet dancers
New York City Ballet dancers
Living people
Year of birth missing (living people)
Ballet masters